The Buckquoy spindle-whorl is an Ogham-inscribed spindle-whorl dating from the Early Middle Ages, probably the 8th century, which was found in 1970 in Buckquoy, Birsay, Orkney, Scotland. Made of sandy limestone, it is about 36 mm in diameter and 10 mm thick. It is the only known spindle-whorl with an Ogham inscription.

The inscription was once used as proof that the Pictish language was not Indo-European, being variously read as:
 E(s/n)DDACTA(n/lv)IM(v/lb)
 (e/)(s/n/)DDACTANIMV
 (e/)TMIQAVSALL(e/q)
However, in 1995 historian Katherine Forsyth reading 
 ENDDACTANIM(f/lb)
proposed that the inscription was a standard Old Irish ogham benedictory message, Benddact anim L. meaning "a blessing on the soul of L.". The stone from which the whorl was made, and on which the inscription was written, is likely to have originated in Orkney.

See also
Epigraphy
Ogham inscription

Notes

References

1970 archaeological discoveries
1970 in Scotland
Archaeology of Scotland
Goidelic languages
History of Orkney
Pictish culture
8th century in Scotland
Ogham inscriptions
Irish inscriptions
Mainland, Orkney